Alpha-N-acetylgalactosaminide alpha-2,6-sialyltransferase 6 is an enzyme that in humans is encoded by the ST6GALNAC6 gene.

References

Further reading